The tenth season of The Voice Brasil, premieres on TV Globo on Tuesday, October 26, 2021, in the  (BRT / AMT) slot, immediately following the special re-airing of the telenovela Império (2014).

Claudia Leitte returned to the panel after a five-year hiatus, along with returning coaches Carlinhos Brown, Iza, Lulu Santos and Michel Teló, thus making it the first season to have five coaches.

The season introduced "The Comeback Stage", where artists eliminated from the Blind Auditions, Knockouts, and Battles are selected and coached by Teló to form his team that will ultimately join the main competition in the "Cross Battles" round (which made a return for the first time since season seven). However, this season's Cross Battles were pre-recorded and, as result, does not feature the public vote component. Instead, the winner is determined by the three coaches not involved in the Battle.

Giuliano Eriston was announced the winner of the season on December 23, 2021. This marked Michel Teló's sixth victory in seven seasons as a coach.

Teams 
 Key

  Winner
  Runner-up
  Eliminated in the Live shows
  Stolen in the Remix
  Eliminated in the Cross Battles
  Eliminated in the Comeback Stage Battles
  Eliminated in the Battles
  Selected to participate in Comeback Stage
  Stolen in the Knockouts
  Eliminated in the Knockouts
  Withdrew

Blind Auditions 
In the Blind auditions, each coach had to complete their teams with 18 contestants. Each coach had two Blocks to prevent another of the coaches from getting a contestant. Some participants who got no chair turn were chosen to participate in The Comeback Stage.

Note: At the end of the blind auditions, Iza did not use her second block.

Auditions not shown 

Due to the large number of auditions (over 70) for just four episodes of blind auditions, TV Globo put some presentations available on the program's website, within the platform Gshow. In total, 24 auditions were not broadcast, six from each team.

Knockouts 
For this phase, each coach selected six team members to sing in knockouts of two. Each coach was allowed to steal one losing artist from another coach, while the fifth coach, Teló, was able to steal two.

Battles 
For the battles round, each coach divides their artists in pairs to sing the same song. The 'steals' were removed for the first time this season, and only the fifth coach, Teló, could select eliminated artists to participate in the Comeback Stage. Contestants who win their battle advance to the Cross battles.

The Comeback Stage 
This season's fifth coach, Michel Teló, had to select artists to form his team: five artists who did not make a team during the Blind auditions, two eliminated artists from the Knockouts, and ten from the Battles. Unlike other countries' Comeback Stages, this version has only one elimination round (the battles), to be broadcast exclusively on the network's website, Gshow. The intention is only to create an eight-member team to join the main competition for the Cross Battles (adding a fifth chair on the coaching panel), and compete to win the tenth season of The Voice Brasil just like a regular team.

Cross Battles 
For this round, coaches select an artist from their team, then challenge a fellow coach to compete against, and this coach selects an artist as well. The winner of the battle is decided by the three coaches not involved in the battle. Out of their eight team members, the coaches only chose four to participate in the phase, while the other four were sent automatically to the Remix. Coaches' names in bold means they were the challenger of the battle. Team Teló joins the main competition in this phase.

Remix 
First, in this phase, each coach was able to automatically send three of their team artists to the live shows, as presented in the table below.

Then, the remaining artists performed for their coach, who could only choose two artists to continue on the team. By default, Lulu did not need to choose since he only had two artists remaining on his team, and Iza did not choose as well, because her team had only one artist remaining. The order of the coaches choosing their artists was set by the number of wins each coach had on the Cross Battles.

Finally, in the Repechage, the coaches had to finish their teams of six members. Brown, Claudia, Lulu, and Teló chose one artist to be on their teams, while Iza chose two. Again, the order of choosing was set by the number of wins on the Cross Battles.

Live shows 
Artist's info

  Team Brown
  Team Claudia
  Team Teló
  Team Iza
  Team Lulu

Result details

  Winner
  Runner-up
  Received the most points
  Saved by the public
  Eliminated but called to come back
  Withdrew due to COVID-19
  Eliminated

Ratings and reception

Brazilian ratings
All numbers are in points and provided by Kantar Ibope Media.

References

External links
Official website on Gshow.com

10
2021 Brazilian television seasons